Lake Emma is a natural lake in the U.S. state of South Dakota.

According to a Native American legend, the lake bears the name of Emma Mato, a woman who repeatedly returned to the lake to search for her lover, who drowned there.

See also
List of lakes in South Dakota

References

Lakes of South Dakota
Lakes of Marshall County, South Dakota
Lakes of Roberts County, South Dakota